Yevhen Bohonosiuk (born 18 January 1982) is a Ukrainian gymnast. He competed at the 2004 Summer Olympics.

References

External links
 

1982 births
Living people
Ukrainian male artistic gymnasts
Olympic gymnasts of Ukraine
Gymnasts at the 2004 Summer Olympics
Gymnasts from Kyiv
21st-century Ukrainian people